Christopher Díaz may refer to:

 Christopher Díaz (footballer) (born 1995), Chilean footballer
 Christopher Díaz (boxer) (born 1994), Puerto Rican boxer
 Christopher Díaz Figueroa (born 1990), tennis player from Guatemala
 Christopher Díaz, a main character on 9-1-1 (TV series)